The 3rd Royal Lancashire Militia (The Duke of Lancaster's Own) was an auxiliary regiment raised in the county of Lancashire in North West England during the French Revolutionary War. It later became part of the Loyal North Lancashire Regiment. Although primarily intended for home defence, its battalions served in Ireland, Gibraltar and Malta and saw active service during the Second Boer War. After conversion to the Special Reserve (SR) under the Haldane Reforms it supplied reinforcements to the fighting battalions during World War I. After a shadowy postwar existence the unit was finally disbanded in 1953.

Background

The universal obligation to military service in the Shire levy was long established in England and its legal basis was updated by two Acts of 1557, which placed selected men, the 'Trained Bands', under the command of Lords Lieutenant appointed by the monarch. This is seen as the starting date for the organised county militia in England. It was an important element in the country's defence at the time of the Spanish Armada in the 1580s, and control of the militia was one of the areas of dispute between King Charles I and Parliament that led to the English Civil War. The English Militia was re-established under local control in 1662 after the Restoration of the monarchy, and the Lancashire Militia fought in King William III's campaign in Ireland in 1690–91, and against the Jacobite Risings in 1715 and 1745. However, between periods of national emergency the militia was regularly allowed to decline.

Under threat of French invasion during the Seven Years' War a series of Militia Acts from 1757 reorganised the county militia regiments, the men being conscripted by means of parish ballots (paid substitutes were permitted) to serve for three years. In 1760 Lancashire's quota was set at 800 men in one regiment, which received the title Royal Lancashire Militia in 1761. These reformed regiments were 'embodied' for permanent service in home defence until the end of the Seven Years' War and again during the War of American Independence. In peacetime they assembled for 28 days' annual training. The militia were re-embodied shortly before Revolutionary France declared war on Britain on 1 February 1793.

3rd Royal Lancashire Militia

French Revolutionary War
Lancashire's militia quota set in 1760 was small in proportion to its population, which soared during the Industrial Revolution. By 1796 it represented only one man in every 43 of those eligible. But in that year  an additional ballot was carried out to raise men for the 'Supplementary Militia' to reinforce the standing militia regiments and to form additional temporary regiments. Lancashire's quota was increased to five regiments, and recruitment became difficult. Nevertheless, the 2nd Royal Lancashire Supplementary Militia was raised on 2 March 1797 at Preston under the command of Sir Henry Hoghton, 7th Baronet (Member of parliament (MP) for Preston) as Colonel of the Regiment. It was formally embodied for service on 25 February 1798, and was placed on a permanent footing as the 3rd Royal Lancashire Militia (3rd RLM) in 1800. The Peace of Amiens was signed on 27 March 1802, and the regiment was disembodied on 24 April, apart from the small permanent staff. The supplementary militia was abolished in 1799, the remaining balloted men in Lancashire being distributed to the 1st, 2nd and 3rd RLM to fill vacancies

Napoleonic Wars

The Peace of Amiens was short-lived, and the militia was called out again: the 3rd Royal Lancashire Militia being embodied on 4 April 1803 under the command of Col Wilson Gale-Braddyll of Conishead Priory. From about 1804 the regiment's 10 companies included a rifle company. During the French Wars the militia were employed anywhere in the country for coast defence, manning garrisons, guarding prisoners of war, and for internal security, while the Regular Army regarded them as a source of trained men if they could be persuaded to transfer. The 3rd RLM was successively stationed at Exeter, Bristol, Gosport, Alton, Chichester and Dover. The regiment was granted the subtitle The Prince Regent's Own in 1813 (Col Gale-Braddyll was an associate of the Prince Regent).

The 3rd RLM volunteered for service in Ireland in 1813. Although most of the militia was disembodied after the Treaty of Fontainebleau in April 1814, the 3rd RLM was still in Ireland when Napoleon escaped from Elba and returned to power in France in 1815. The three regiments of Lancashire Militia, which happened to be stationed together at Dublin, were allowed to recruit back to full strength by ballot and 'by beat of drum'. They also provided drafts of around 1000 volunteers to the regular regiments being sent to Belgium. There is a story that many of the Guardsmen at the Battle of Waterloo were still wearing their Militia uniforms. The militia continued to do duty after the Battle of Waterloo while much of the Regular Army was with the Army of Occupation, and the 3rd RLM did not return from Ireland to be disembodied until January 1816.

Long peace
An Act of 1817 allowed the annual training of the Militia to be dispensed with. So although officers continued to be commissioned into the regiment and the ballot was regularly held, the selected men were rarely mustered for drill. The 3rd RLM's rifle company was disbanded in 1829. In 1831 King William IV bestowed on the three Lancashire Militia Regiments the additional title The Duke of Lancaster's Own. (replacing the title 'Prince Regent's Own' carried by the 3rd RLM). No further militia training took place for the next 21 years. Although officers continued to be appointed to fill vacancies (the local politician John Wilson-Patten (later Lord Winmarleigh) was appointed colonel in 1842) the ballot was suspended.

1852 reforms
The Militia of the United Kingdom was revived by the Militia Act of 1852, enacted during a period of international tension. As before, units were raised and administered on a county basis, and filled by voluntary enlistment (although conscription by means of the militia ballot might be used if the counties failed to meet their quotas). Training was for 56 days on enlistment, then for 21–28 days per year, during which the men received full army pay. Under the Act, militia units could be embodied by Royal Proclamation for full-time service in three circumstances:
 1. 'Whenever a state of war exists between Her Majesty and any foreign power'.
 2. 'In all cases of invasion or upon imminent danger thereof'.
 3. 'In all cases of rebellion or insurrection'.

With the threat of war against Russia, the three Lancashire regiments were ordered to recruit up to their full establishment of 1200 men, and two additional militia infantry regiments (the 4th and 5th) and an artillery unit were formed in Lancashire. Once the Crimean War had broken out the 6th and 7th Lancashire Militia were formed and the 2nd RLM also raised a 2nd Battalion at this time. The different regiments were each allocated a recruiting area with the 3rd RLM, based at Preston, also recruiting from Blackburn, Garstang, Leyland and Rochdale.

Crimea and after
War having broken out with Russia in 1854 and an expeditionary force sent to the Crimea, the militia were called out for home defence and service in overseas garrisons. The 3rd RLM was embodied in April 1855 and volunteered for overseas service. It sailed from Liverpool to Gibraltar where it carried out garrison duty for a year, commanded in person by its colonel, John Wilson-Patten, MP, despite his political duties. It returned to the UK to be disembodied in July 1856. The regiment was awarded the Battle honour Mediterranean for this service. Although a number of militia regiments were embodied to relieve regular units sent to fight in the Indian Mutiny, the 3rd RLM was not among them.

In 1867 the Militia Reserve was created, consisting of present and former militiamen who undertook to serve overseas in case of war.

Cardwell reforms

Under the 'Localisation of the Forces' scheme introduced by the Cardwell Reforms of 1872, Militia regiments were brigaded with regular and Volunteer battalions in a regimental district sharing a permanent depot at a suitable county town. Seven double-battalion or pairs of single-battalion regular regiments were assigned to Lancashire, and each was linked with one of the county's militia regiments. The militia now came under the War Office rather than their county lords lieutenant, and officers' commissions were signed by the Queen.

The 3rd RLM was linked with the 47th (Lancashire) and 81st (Loyal Lincoln Volunteers) Regiments of Foot in Sub-District No 12 (Lancashire), with the depot established at Fulwood Barracks in Preston. It was intended for the 3rd RLM to raise its own 2nd Battalion. Although often referred to as brigades, the regimental districts were purely administrative organisations, but in a continuation of the Cardwell Reforms a mobilisation scheme began to appear in the Army List from December 1875. This assigned regular and militia units to places in an order of battle of corps, divisions and brigades for the 'Active Army', even though these formations were entirely theoretical, with no staff or services assigned. The 1st, 2nd and 3rd Royal Lancashire Militia formed 1st Brigade of 3rd Division, VI Corps; the brigade would have mustered at Manchester in time of war.

3rd and 4th Battalions, Loyal North Lancashire Regiment

The Childers Reforms completed the process by incorporating the militia battalions into the expanded county regiments. On 1 July 1881 the 47th and 81st Foot became the 1st and 2nd Battalions of the Loyal North Lancashire Regiment with the 3rd Royal Lancashire Militia (The Duke of Lancaster's Own) as its 3rd Battalion. The 2nd Bn of the 3rd RLM, which had finally been formed during 1879, became the 4th Bn Loyals; however, it was amalgamated back into the 3rd Bn in 1896. Militia battalions now had a large cadre of permanent staff (about 30). Around a third of the recruits and many young officers went on to join the Regular Army.

Second Boer War
After the disasters of Black Week at the start of the Second Boer War in December 1899, most of the regular army was sent to South Africa, followed by many militia reservists as reinforcements. Militia units were embodied to replace them for home defence and a number volunteered for active service or to garrison overseas stations.

The 3rd Bn Loyals was among the first militia units to be embodied, on 13 December 1899, and went to Kent for pre-deployment training at Shorncliffe and Lydd. It then embarked on 12 January 1900 and sailed to Malta to relieve a regular army battalion in the garrison there. A year later the manpower needs of the guerrilla war in South Africa led to the battalion re-embarking from Malta on 2 March 1901. It arrived in South Africa on 30 March with a strength of 24 officers and 805 other ranks (ORs) under the command of Lieutenant-Colonel James Pedder, and was employed on the lines of communication from Port Elizabeth to Aliwal North. Lieutenant Mackie of the battalion distinguished himself by his handling of a party of Mounted infantry against a superior number of Boers and in endeavouring to bring in a wounded man; he was rewarded with a regular commission. The battalion embarked for home on 13 February 1902 and was disembodied on 15 March.

While serving in South Africa the battalion lost three ORs killed or died of disease. It was awarded the Battle Honours Mediterranean 1900–01 and South Africa 1901–02 and the officers and men received the Queen's South Africa Medal with clasps '1901' and '1902'.

Special Reserve
After the Boer War, the future of the Militia was called into question. There were moves to reform the Auxiliary Forces (Militia, Yeomanry and Volunteers) to take their place in the six army corps proposed by St John Brodrick as Secretary of State for War. However, little of Brodrick's scheme was carried out.

Under the sweeping Haldane Reforms of 1908, the Militia was replaced by the Special Reserve, a semi-professional force similar to the previous Militia Reserve, whose role was to provide reinforcement drafts for regular units serving overseas in wartime. The battalion became the 3rd (Reserve) Battalion, Loyal North Lancashire Regiment, on 27 July 1908.

World War I
The Special Reserve was embodied on the outbreak of World War I on 4 August 1914 and on 9 August the battalion proceeded under the command of Lt-Col Thomas Cowper-Essex (commanding officer since 1906) to its war station at Felixstowe in the Harwich Garrison. Here it remained for the whole war, carrying out the dual tasks of garrison duties and preparing reinforcement drafts of regular reservists, special reservists, recruits and returning wounded for the regular battalions serving overseas. The 1st Bn served on the Western Front for the whole war; the 2nd Bn was in India on the outbreak of war and landed in East Africa, later transferring to Egypt and finally to the Western Front. The 3rd Bn probably also assisted in the formation of 11th (Reserve) Battalion of the Loyals on 2 October 1914 at Felixstowe and Billericay from Kitchener's Army volunteers. After the war the 3rd Bn was disembodied on 2 August 1919.

Postwar
The SR resumed its old title of Militia in 1921 and then became the Supplementary Reserve in 1924, but almost all militia battalions remained in abeyance after World War I. By 1939 the only officer in the Army List for 3rd Bn was Lt-Col Sir Vivian Henderson, commanding officer since 1921. The militia were not activated during World War II and were all formally disbanded in April 1953.

Commanders

Commanding Officers
The following served as Colonel or (after 1852) Lieutenant-Colonel Commandant of the regiment (incomplete list):
 Sir Henry Hoghton, 7th Baronet, commissioned as colonel 2 March 1797, until 1803
 Col Wilson Gale-Braddyll, promoted 1803
 Col Sir Thomas Dalrymple Hesketh, 3rd Baronet of Rufford, formerly Lt-Col Commandant of the Leyland and Ormskirk Local Militia 1808–16, died 27 July 1842
 Col John Wilson-Patten (later Lord Winmarleigh), appointed 15 November 1842
 Lt-Col Thomas Crosse, appointed (1st Bn) 1 August 1874
 Lt-Col Frederick Silvester, appointed (2nd Bn) 20 September 1879
 Lt-Col Leith Bonhôte, appointed 29 September 1897
 Lt-Col James Pedder, promoted 3 July 1901
 Lt-Col Thomas Cowper-Essex, promoted 15 September 1906, and continued with the SR battalion 26 July 1908
 Lt-Col Sir Vivian Henderson, MC, appointed 15 October 1921

Honorary Colonels
The following served as Honorary Colonel
of the regiment:
 Col Lord Winmarleigh, appointed 27 February 1872
 Field Marshal Frederick, Earl Roberts, appointed 1 January 1898, continued with the SR battalion 26 July 1908
 Col Thomas Cowper-Essex, appointed 22 March 1916

Other personalities
 Frank Percy Crozier, former lieutenant in the Manchester Regiment, was commissioned as a captain in the 3rd Bn  Loyals on 17 June 1908, but was forced to resign the following year over dishonoured cheques. He was later a mercenary officer in the illegal Ulster Volunteers, achieved the rank of Brigadier-General during World War I, and was author of A Brass Hat in No Man's Land and other works.

Uniforms & Insignia
The uniform of the Royal Lancashire Militia was red with the blue facings appropriate to 'Royal' regiments. By 1803 the lace button loops were arranged in threes (denoting the 3rd Regiment, as in the Brigade of Guards). By Royal warrant in 1805 militia colonels were reminded that their grenadier company was to wear the Bearskin cap (despite the cost). The rifle company of the 3rd RLM was dressed in the style of the 95th Rifles.

Around 1810 the regimental buttons bore the number '3' over the letters 'RL' within a crowned star, after 1810 the centre of the eight-rayed star had a circle inscribed '3 ROYAL + LANCASHIRE' enclosing a Lancashire rose, with a coronet above. The officers' oval pouchbelt plate had a similar design without the star, the circle being a garter inscribed 'THIRD ROYAL LANCASHIRE'. After 1813 the lettering on the buttons changed to 'PRINCE REGENT'S OWN' and the coronet reverted to a crown.

In 1803 the colonels of the three Lancashire Militia regiments were granted royal permission to use the Red Rose of Lancaster as the badge on their blue Regimental colours. Another source suggests that the badges and buttons (date unspecified) had the red rose within a palm wreath. The officers' waistbelt plate of 1855–81 was of the universal pattern with the Royal cypher ('VR') and crown within a circle inscribed with the title.

When the 3rd RLM joined the Loyals in 1881, it adopted that regiment's white facings and insignia.

Precedence
In the early days militia regiments serving together drew lots for their relative precedence. From 1778 the counties were given an order of precedence determined by ballot each year, but the militia order of precedence balloted for in 1793 (when Lancashire was 37th) remained in force throughout the French Revolutionary War: this covered all the regiments formed in the county. Another ballot for precedence took place at the start of the Napoleonic War: Lancashire was 52nd. This list continued until 1833. In that year the King drew the lots for individual regiments and the resulting list remained in force with minor amendments until the end of the militia; the 3rd RLM was 125th. Formally, the regiment became the 125th, or 3rd Royal Lancashire Militia (The Duke of Lancaster's Own), but like most regiments it seems to have paid little attention to the additional number.

See also
 Militia (English)
 Militia (Great Britain)
 Militia (United Kingdom)
 Special Reserve
 Lancashire Militia
 Loyal North Lancashire Regiment

Footnotes

Notes

References

 W.Y. Baldry, 'Order of Precedence of Militia Regiments', Journal of the Society for Army Historical Research, Vol 15, No 57 (Spring 1936), pp. 5–16.
 John Bourne, Who's Who in World War I , London: Routledge, 2002, .
 Col John K. Dunlop, The Development of the British Army 1899–1914, London: Methuen, 1938.
 Sir John Fortescue, A History of the British Army, Vol I, 2nd Edn, London: Macmillan, 1910.
 Sir John Fortescue, A History of the British Army, Vol II, London: Macmillan, 1899.
 Sir John Fortescue, A History of the British Army, Vol III, 2nd Edn, London: Macmillan, 1911.
 J.B.M. Frederick, Lineage Book of British Land Forces 1660–1978, Vol I, Wakefield: Microform Academic, 1984, .
 Lt-Col James Moncrieff Grierson (Col Peter S. Walton, ed.), Scarlet into Khaki: The British Army on the Eve of the Boer War, London: Sampson Low, 1899/London: Greenhill, 1988, .
 H.G. Hart, The New Annual Army List, and Militia List, 1840.
 Col George Jackson Hay, An Epitomized History of the Militia (The Constitutional Force), London:United Service Gazette, 1905/Ray Westlake Military Books, 1987, .
 Richard Holmes, Soldiers: Army Lives and Loyalties from Redcoats to Dusty Warriors, London: HarperPress, 2011, .
 Brig E.A. James, British Regiments 1914–18, London: Samson Books, 1978/Uckfield: Naval & Military Press, 2001, .
 Roger Knight, Britain Against Napoleon: The Organization of Victory 1793–1815, London: Allen Lane, 2013/Penguin, 2014, .
 N.B. Leslie, Battle Honours of the British and Indian Armies 1695–1914, London: Leo Cooper, 1970, .
 H.G. Parkyn, 'English Militia Regiments 1757–1935: Their Badges and Buttons', Journal of the Society for Army Historical Research, Vol 15, No 60 (Winter 1936), pp. 216–248.
 Edward M. Spiers, The Army and Society 1815–1914, London: Longmans, 1980, .
 Edward M. Spiers, The Late Victorian Army 1868–1902, Manchester: Manchester University Press, 1992/Sandpiper Books, 1999, .
 J.R. Western, The English Militia in the Eighteenth Century, London: Routledge & Kegan Paul, 1965.
 Maj R.J.T. Williamson & Col J. Lawson Whalley, History of the Old County Regiment of Lancashire Militia, London: Simpkin, Marshall, 1888.

External sources
 History of Parliament Online
 Duke of Lancaster's Regiment, Lancashire Infantry Museum
 Lancashire Record Office, Handlist 72
 Richard A. Warren, This Re-illuminated School of Mars: Auxiliary forces and other aspects of Albion under Arms in the Great War against France
 Museum of the Manchester Regiment
 Land Forces of Britain, the Empire and Commonwealth – Regiments.org (archive site)

Lancashire Militia
Lancashire
Military units and formations in Lancashire
Military units and formations in Preston, Lancashire
Military units and formations established in 1797
Military units and formations disestablished in 1881